Louis Joseph Marie Théodore de Goesbriand (August 4, 1816 – November 3, 1899) was a French-born prelate of the Roman Catholic Church. He served as the first bishop of the Diocese of Burlington in Vermont from 1853 until his death in 1899.

Biography

Early life 
Louis de Goesbriand was born on August 4, 1815, in Saint-Urbain, Finistère, in France to a wealthy family.  After deciding to enter the priesthood, he studied at the Seminary of Saint-Sulpice in Paris. At some point, he was recruited to come to the United States. 

De Goesbriand was ordained to the priesthood in Paris for the Diocese of Saint Paul by Bishop Joseph Rosati on July 13, 1840. 

After arriving in the United States, de Goesbriand did pastoral work for the Diocese of Cincinnati in Cincinnati, Ohio, from 1840 to 1847.  He was then appointed vicar general for the Diocese of Cleveland in Cleveland, Ohio, serving there until 1854.

Priesthood 
On July 29, 1853, de Goesbriand was appointed as the first bishop of the newly erected Diocese of Burlington by Pope Pius IX. He received his episcopal consecration on October 30, 1853, at St. Patrick's Cathedral in New York City from Archbishop Gaetano Bedini, with Bishops John McCloskey and Louis Rappe serving as co-consecrators. De Goesbriand began his new diocese with five priests, ten churches, and about 20,000 parishioners.

Bishop of Burlington 
In January 1855, de Goesbriand traveled to Europe to recruit priests from Ireland and  France to serve to Vermont.  He held the first diocesan synod in Vermont in October 1855.  He also attended the Plenary Councils of Baltimore in Baltimore, Maryland, in 1866 and 1884, and the First Vatican Council in Rome from 1869 to 1870. In 1893, De Goesbriand delegated administration of the diocese to Coadjutor Bishop John Michaud. He spent his entire family fortune constructing churches and orphanages and assisting the poor, dying with only four dollars left to his name. 

Between 1891 and 1897, de Goesbriand translated several works of Reverend Pierre Chaignon from French to English, including Meditations for the Use of the Secular Clergy and The Sacrifice of the Mass Worthily Celebrated.

Death and legacy 
Louis De Goesbriand died on November 3, 1899, at St. Joseph's Orphan Home in Burlington at age 83, then the oldest bishop in the United States. He is buried at Resurrection Park in South Burlington, Vermont. 

The diocese had least 50 priests and 30 new parishes when de Goesbriand died.  In the 1920s, De Goesbriand Memorial Hospital in Burlington was created in his name. In 2019, the diocese opened a cause for canonization for de Goesbriand.  As of yet, there are no miracles attributed to him, a requirement for sainthood.

References

1816 births
1899 deaths
French emigrants to the United States
Seminary of Saint-Sulpice (France) alumni
People from Finistère
Roman Catholic Diocese of Cleveland
Roman Catholic bishops of Burlington
French Roman Catholic bishops in North America
De Goesbriand, Louis
19th-century Roman Catholic bishops in the United States
American Servants of God
20th-century venerated Christians